Deir-e Gachin Caravansarai is one of the greatest caravansarais of Iran and is located in the center of Kavir National Park. Its unique qualities is the reason it is called “Mother of Iranian Caravansarais”. It is located in the Central District of Qom County, 80 kilometers north-east of Qom (60 kilometers into Garmsar Freeway) and 35 kilometers south-west of Varamin. This monument was registered in Iran's National Heritage List on September 23, 2003. The structure of this caravanserai belongs to Sasanian era, and restorations took place in Seljuk, Safavid and Qajar eras. Its current form belongs to Safavid era. This caravanserai is situated on the ancient rout from Ray to Isfahan.

The structure of this caravansarai is in Seljuki four-iwan form and is 12000 square meters wide. The interior spaces of the caravansarai include human, livestock, service and convenience, and security spaces. There are four circular towers at the corners and two half-oval towers at both sides of the main gate which is situated in the middle of the southern wall. Also, there are 44 rooms or chambers, 4 big halls (stables), mosque, private shabestan, fodder barn, gristmill, bathroom and toilet. The materials used in Deir-e Gachin are brick, lime, adobe and plaster. The mosque of the caravanserai was probably built in the place of the Sasanian fire temple and there are no decorations in it. There are a number of structures around the caravanserai as a collection including two Ab anbars behind the western side and close to the bathroom, a brick furnace, a dam, and a graveyard in the south-western side in which the graves are covered with bricks and that goes back to the Islamic era. There is a brick-clay-made structure in the form of a fort 500 meters east of the caravanserai which has only one entrance gate and its structure goes back to the Qajar era.

Etymology and history 

Today, however, there is no such  in the structure.

The construction of the structure is attributed to Ardashir-e Bābakān (Ardashir I) and so it has also been called Kardashir (done by Ardashir). Ya'qubi attributes it to Anushiruwān (Khosrow I). In History of Qom by Hasan ibn Mohammad Qomi, it is attributed to Anushiruwān but it can be implied by the text that he did not build the initial structure, and probably the structure was built in the beginning of Sasanian era (Ardashir I) and it was rebuilt in the Anushiruwān era. As Qomi mentions, the king of Rûm sent a group of Amalek, which were the survivors of the ʿĀd tribe and had enormous bodies, to Anushiruwān to serve him and he appointed them to construct this structure.

Location and importance 

Deir-e Gachin Caravansarai, one of the biggest caravansarais of Iran, is located in the center of Kavir National Park. Its unique qualities is the reason it is called “Mother of Iranian Caravansarais”.

From long ago, the location of Deir-e Gachin on the ancient rout from Ray to Isfahan has been the gathering point of the connecting routes between east and west, and the northern, western, southern and eastern routes to Rey traversed in this spot. In the Medes and Achaemenid eras, this place connected the eastern, northern, southern and western states, and it had a defensive importance. In addition, in the Seleucid, Parthian, and Sasanian eras, the commercial importance of this place increased. It has counted as a part of the Silk Road which extended from Ctesiphon to Balkh, Samarkand, and Bukhara. This route started from the capital of China (Xi'an) and continued to Hotan and Kashgar, and then arrived at Rey and Deir-e Gachin, and from there it went through Saveh or Qazvin to Kermanshah and Hamadan and then to Ctesiphon and Babylon, and continued from there to Antakya in the shores of Mediterranean Sea.

Structure 

The structure of the caravanserai is a 109 in 108 meter square (approximately 12000 square meters) with four circular towers at the corners and two towers in the form of half-oval at both sides of the main entrance which is in the middle of the southern wall. The architecture of this structure is in four-iwan form which includes 44 rooms or chambers, 4 big halls (stables), mosque, private shabestan, fodder barn, gristmill, bathroom and toilet. The materials used in Deir-e Gachin are brick, lime, adobe and plaster. Rock is used only in gristmill, mihrab of the mosque and the upper part of the gate which do not exist now. Wood is not used in this structure and the chambers do not have doors and windows but, presumably, the gate, which there is no sign of it now, had been made of wood.

The exterior walls are more than three meters thick and resistant against natural dangers and disasters. The interior courtyard is a 69 meter square and in each side of it there is an iwan and 10 chambers (rooms), and each chamber has a small iwan with the approximate height of 1 to 1.5 meters devised for the convenience in loading and unloading of the passengers’ luggage as well as articulating the interior view of the structure.

In the square form of this caravanserai, the fixed elements, i.e. the chambers and the main iwans, are situated across the sides next to each other and the unstable elements in the four corners of the square and in the middle of the sides; so, the main gate is in the middle of the southern side and iwans or shahneshins in the middle of the rest of the sides. In the four corners of the structure, the service spaces are situated; the mosque in the right corner of the southern side, the private shabestan in the right corner of the northern side, the bathroom in the left corner of the southern side, and the barn and gristmill in the left corner of the northern side.

The northern iwan or shahneshin of the structure is more spacious than the other iwans and there is a lobby with three chambers in the back of it. Behind the chambers of each side, the stables are situated which are built in the form of a long corridor with arched vaults that connects to the courtyard through two exits.

Interior Spaces

Human Spaces 

There are 44 chambers and residential rooms in the caravanserai. The rooms are almost uniform. In each room, there are 9 niches at the height of one meter from the floor, and there is a fireplace inside the wall across from the entrance. The entrances of the rooms are small and arched in the tops which is suitable for heat preservation. The rooms do not have windows to the stables. Each room has a small iwan (porch). There are holes inside the walls between the iwans as drawbars and the travelers could treat the animals in front of the room before taking them to the stable. The iwan walls, like the rooms, have niches. Also, there are 66 iwans or small platforms inside the stables which were for the lodging of the caravan crew. The size of these platforms are not the same and is different depending on the lodging of one person or a group. As in the rooms, there is a fireplace in all the platforms which are at a convenient height from the floor of the stable.

Livestock Spaces 

The livestock spaces and stables are situated behind the rooms and their entrances are L-shaped so that in case an animal runs off they cannot exit easily. The stables are roofed and the light needed is provided through skylights in the sealing, and the width of the stables are enough for two camels with luggage to pass by one another. In this caravanserai, all the animals were together and there were no exclusive places for different kinds of animals.

Service and Convenience Spaces 

The mosque is located in the far right of the southern side and it has four columns 1.5 meters high and, as mentioned by Iranica, it probably was built in the place of the Sasanian fire temple. There are no decorations in the mosque. In the middle of the southern side which is directed to the Qibla, there is a place for a mihrab.

The bathroom is located in the left corner of the southern side and is as wide as the mosque. The erosion of this part of the structure has been more compared to the whole structure; the sealing is ruined and some of the walls are collapsed.

In the north-eastern corner of the structure there is a separate shabestan with an octagonal courtyard. This part with a special design and full equipment is the most aristocratic part of the caravanserai and had been the place for high-ranking people.

Security Spaces 

There are four big towers at the four corners and two half-tower at both sides of the main gate. These towers were used for guarding as well as for lighting torches in order to find the location of the caravanserai at night.

Exterior Structures 
There are a number of structures around the caravanserai as a collection. They include two Ab anbars behind the western side and close to the bathroom, a brick furnace, a dam, and a graveyard in the south-western side in which the graves are covered with bricks and that goes back to the Islamic era. There is a brick-clay-made structure in the form of a fort 500 meters east of the caravanserai which has only one entrance gate and its structure goes back to the Qajar era. Most of the structure is now ruined.

References

Caravanserais in Iran
Sasanian architecture
Safavid architecture
National works of Iran